or  ( or ) is the general term for ritual purification in Shinto.  is one of four essential elements involved in a Shinto ceremony. The purpose is the purification of pollution or sins and uncleanness. These concepts include bad luck and disease as well as guilt in the English sense. 

People, places, and objects can all be the object of harae.

History 

 stems from the myth of Susano-o, the brother of the Sun goddess Amaterasu. According to the myth, while Amaterasu was supervising the weaving of the garments of the gods in the pure weaving hall, Susano-o broke through the roof and let fall a heavenly horse which had been flayed. This startled one of her attendants who, in her agitation, accidentally killed herself with the loom's shuttle. Amaterasu fled to the heavenly cave Amano-Iwato. Susano-o was subsequently expelled from heaven and Amaterasu's sovereignty resumed. The traditional Shinto purification ritual  is represented when Susano-o is removed from heaven.

Practice 

Often, water and salt are used for the ceremonies to rinse hands and the face, as well as the shrine before it is prepared with offerings of goods and food. Then the priest, along with the rest of the participants of the ritual chant a solemn liturgy before the assistant priest purifies the offerings using a wand called . 

 is another method performed as a cleansing ritual to cleanse a large group of people. This ritual is practiced mostly in June and December to purify the nation, as well as after a disaster occurs. The practice is also performed at the year-end festival and also before major national festivals. 

, a cleansing ritual performed by sprinkling salt, is another practice of the Shinto religion. In addition, sprinkling salt over a person after attending a funeral is also practiced commonly in the Shinto religion. Another example of this cleansing ritual is to sprinkle water at the gate of one's home, both in the morning and evening. A significant and visible form of this ritual is when sumo wrestlers sprinkle salt around the fighting ring before a match, to purify the area.

See also 
 Consecration
 Glossary of Shinto for an explanation of terms concerning Japanese Shinto, Shinto art, and Shinto shrine architecture.

References

BBC. (n.d.). Harae - purification rites. BBC - Homepage. Retrieved May 15, 2011, from http://www.bbc.co.uk/religion/religions/shinto/ritesrituals/harae.shtml
Basic terms of shinto. (n.d.). Kokugakuin University. Retrieved May 16, 2011, from www2.kokugakuin.ac.jp/ijcc/wp/bts/index.html
Ben-Ari, E. (1991). Transformation in ritual, transformation of ritual: audiences and rites in a Japanese commuter village. Ethnology, 30(2), 135-147. Retrieved May 15, 2011, from the JSTOR database.
Boyd, J. W., & Williams, R. G. (2005). Japanese Shintō: an interpretation of a priestly perspective. Philosophy East and West, 55(1), 33-63. Retrieved May 14, 2011, from the JSTOR database.
Chamberlain, B. H. (1893). Some minor Japanese religious practices.  The Journal of the Anthropological Institute of Great Britain and Ireland, 22, 355-370. Retrieved May 16, 2011, from the JSTOR database.
Miller, A. L. (1984). Ame no miso-ori me" (the heavenly weaving maiden): the cosmic weaver in early shinto myth and ritual. History of Religions, 24(1), 27-48. Retrieved May 14, 2011, from the JSTOR database.
Norbeck, E. (1952). Pollution and taboo in contemporary Japan. Southwestern Journal of Anthropology, 8(3), 269-285. Retrieved May 15, 2011, from the JSTOR database.
Shinto no Iroha (神道のいろは）, Jinjashinpōsha (神社新報社), 2004,
Mihashi, Ken (三橋健), Wa ga ya no Shūkyō: Shinto (わが家の宗教：神道), Daihōrinkaku (大法輪閣), 2003

Exorcism in Shinto
Ritual purification
Shinto